New Others Part One is the fifth studio album by American post-rock band This Will Destroy You. It was released on September 28, 2018, by Dark Operative.

Release and promotion 
The album title and release date was announced on September 6, 2018.

Track listing

References 

2014 albums
This Will Destroy You albums
Albums produced by John Congleton
Suicide Squeeze Records albums
Doom metal albums by American artists
Shoegaze albums by American artists